Lance Baumgard is an American physiologist, currently the Norman L. Jacobson Endowed Professor in Nutritional Physiology at Iowa State University.

Education
Doctor of Philosophy, Cornell University: 2002 (Animal Science)
Master of Science, University of Minnesota, St. Paul: 1998 (Animal Science)
Bachelor of Science, University of Minnesota, St. Paul: 1995 (Science in Agriculture)

References

Year of birth missing (living people)
Living people
Iowa State University faculty
American physiologists
Cornell University College of Agriculture and Life Sciences alumni
University of Minnesota College of Food, Agricultural and Natural Resource Sciences alumni